Johannes Grubenmann (15 June 1707 – 10 June 1771) was a member of the Swiss family Grubenmann who were famous as carpenters and civil engineers in the eighteenth century.

See main article: Grubenmann.

1707 births
1771 deaths
Bridge engineers
Swiss engineers